The 8th Flying Training Squadron is part of the 71st Flying Training Wing based at Vance Air Force Base, Oklahoma. It operates the T-6A Texan II aircraft conducting flight training.

Mission
Performs Joint Specialized Undergraduate Pilot Training with T-6A Texan II trainers.

History

World War II
Activated in early 1942 under Fourth Air Force; after a brief organizational period in Southern California where it was equipped with reconnaissance P-38 Lightnings (F-4) it deployed to the Southwest Pacific Area, being assigned to Fifth Air Force in Australia.

Engaged in long-range tactical reconnaissance missions over New Guinea; later the Netherlands East Indies and in late 1944, over the Philippines in support of MacArthur's Island-Hopping campaign (1942–1945). After the Japanese capitulation in August 1945, became part of the Army of Occupation in Japan. It was not operational between April 1946 and July 1947.

Korean War
From 1947–1949 flew photographic mapping missions over Japan, Korea, Philippines and other areas of western Pacific. During the Korean War, the squadron flew tactical reconnaissance sorties over North and South Korea from, 29 June 1950 – 24 February 1951.

Flying training
The 8th has conducted undergraduate pilot training for active duty, Air National Guard, Air Force Reserve and selected foreign allies since 1 November 1972. Since the mid-1990s, the squadron has also conducted joint primary flight training for selected US Navy and US Marine Corps student naval aviators, with command of the squadron alternating between Air Force officers in the rank of lieutenant colonel and Navy officers in the ranks of commander.

Lineage
 Constituted as the 8th Photographic Squadron on 19 Jan 1942
 Activated 1 Feb 1942
 Redesignated 8th Photographic Reconnaissance Squadron on 9 Jun 1942
 Redesignated 8th Photographic Squadron (Light) on 6 Feb 1943
 Redesignated 8th Photographic Reconnaissance Squadron on 13 Nov 1943
 Redesignated 8th Tactical Reconnaissance Squadron, Night Photographic on 10 Aug 1948
 Redesignated 8th Tactical Reconnaissance Squadron, Photo-Jet on 1 Aug 1949
 Inactivated on 25 Feb 1951
Redesignated 8th Flying Training Squadron on 14 Apr 1972
Activated on 1 Nov 1972

Assignments
 IV Air Support Command, 1 Feb 1942
 Fifth Air Force, 29 Mar 1942 (attached to Allied Air Forces, Apr – Sep 1942)
 V Bomber Command, 5 Sep 1942
 6th Photographic Group (later 6th Reconnaissance Group), 13 Nov 1943 (attached to V Bomber Command after c. 10 Dec 1945)
 V Bomber Command, 27 Apr 1946
 314th Composite Wing, 31 May 1946
 71st Reconnaissance Group (later 71st Tactical Reconnaissance Group), 28 Feb 1947 (attached to 314th Composite Wing until Nov 1947)
 Fifth Air Force, 1 Apr 1949
 543d Tactical Support Group, 26 Sep 1950 – 25 Feb 1951
 71st Flying Training Wing, 1 Nov 1972
 71st Operations Group, 15 Dec 1991 – present

Stations

March Field, California, 1 Feb – 14 Mar 1942
 Two flights remained at March Field, CA, to 16 Jun 1942
 Essendon Airport, Melbourne, Australia, 7 Apr 1942
 Archerfield Airport (Brisbane), Australia, 24 Apr 1942
 Charters Towers Airfield, Australia, 2 May 1942
 Kila Airfield (3 Mile Drome), Port Moresby, New Guinea, 9 Sep 1942
 Nadzab Airfield, New Guinea, 16 Mar 1944
 Operated from Biak after c. 11 Aug 1944
 Mokmer Airfield, Biak, 10 Sep – 20 Oct 1944
 Dulag Airfield, Leyte, Philippines, 4 Nov 1944
 Air Echelon assigned to Clark Field, Luzon, Philippines, 19 May – 12 Aug 1945
 Motobu Airfield, Okinawa, 21 Jul 1945
 Chōfu Airfield, Japan, 28 Sep 1945
Irumagawa Air Base, Japan, 25 Jan 1946
 Yokota Air Base, Japan, 25 Mar 1949
 Detachment operated from Itazuke Air Base, Japan, from 29 Jun 1950
 Itazuke Air Base, Japan, 9 Jul 1950
Taegu Air Base (K-2), South Korea, 2 Oct 1950
Komaki Air Base, Japan
 Operated from Taegu Air Base (K-2), South Korea, 26 Jan – 25 Feb 1951
Vance Air Force Base, Oklahoma, 1 Nov 1972 – present

Aircraft

F-4 Lightning (1942–1944)
F-5 Lightning (1943–1946)
B-17 Flying Fortress (1942–1943)
B-26 Marauder (1943–1944)
F-6 Mustang (1946)
P-51 Mustang (1946)
 P-61 Black Widow (1946)
F-15A/RF-61C Reporter (1947–1949)
RF-80 Shooting Star (1949–1951)
T-37 Tweet (1972–2006)
T-6 Texan II (2006 – present)

Notable members 
Jeffrey B. Cashman, future Brigadier General.
Fred Hargesheimer, pilot turned philanthropist to those who saved his life after he was shot down.
James P. Ulm, future Brigadier General.

References

Notes
 Explanatory notes

 Citations

Bibliography
 
 
 
 
 Further reading
 Stanaway, John and Bob Rocker. The Eight Ballers: Eyes of the Fifth Air Force. The 8th Photo Reconnaissance Squadron in World War II. Atglen, Pennsylvania: Schiffer Publishing, 1999. .

008
0008